Thorius narisovalis is a species of salamander in the family Plethodontidae. It is endemic to Mexico.

The species is known from four disjunct subpopulations in the mountains of northern central Oaxaca – Cerro San Felipe and adjacent upland areas in the Sierra Alaopaneca, the Sierra de Cuatro Venados, and from the vicinity of Tlaxiaco. Its estimated extent of occurrence (EOO) is 2,554 km2. All currently recognized subpopulations have been confirmed as belonging to this species.

Its natural habitats are cloud forests and mixed forests between 2,590 and 3,185 meters eelvation. It lives under bark or under fallen trees.

The species is negatively impacted by habitat loss caused by logging, agriculture, and human settlement. It has, however, declined even in suitable habitat.

References

Narisovalis
Endemic amphibians of Mexico
Fauna of the Sierra Madre de Oaxaca
Fauna of the Sierra Madre del Sur
Taxonomy articles created by Polbot
Amphibians described in 1940